The 1901 Minnesota Golden Gophers football team was an American football team that represented the University of Minnesota in the 1901 Western Conference football season. In its second year under head coach Henry L. Williams, the team compiled a 9–1–1 record (3–1 against Western Conference opponents), finished in third place in the conference, shut out 10 of their 11 opponents, and outscored all opponents by a total of 183 to 18. The only loss came against Wisconsin, which was the only team to score against Minnesota.

Four Minnesota players received honors on the 1901 All-Western college football team:
 Guard John G. Flynn - first-team honors from the Chicago American, Chicago Record-Herald, and Walter Camp
 Center Leroy Albert Page, Jr. - first-team honors from the Chicago Daily News and Chicago Record-Herald
 Tackle Charles W. Fee - first-team honors from the Chicago Daily News
 End Eddie Rogers - first-team honors from the Chicago Tribune

Schedule

References

Minnesota
Minnesota Golden Gophers football seasons
Minnesota Golden Gophers football